Walsall Town Hall is located at Leicester Street in Walsall, West Midlands, England. The building, which opened in 1903, is used for a variety of functions including wedding receptions and concerts. It was designated a grade II listed building in 1986.

History
The town hall's Baroque style design is by the architect James Glen Sivewright Gibson. It has a facade of sandstone ashlar and adjoins Walsall Council House. The design for the entrance includes a round archway with three Tuscan order columns, an architrave and a tympanum above. The building opened in 1903.

The pipe organ, which commemorates the Diamond Jubilee of Queen Victoria, was made by the local firm of Nicholson & Lord and installed in 1908. It was designed with 98 stops, five keyboards and 3,300 pipes. The organist, Harold Britton, recorded a concert entitled "Organ Extravaganza" on the ASV label on the organ in 1991. An episode from series 20 of the BBC programme Antiques Roadshow was filmed in the hall in November 1997.

Rock bands that performed at the Walsall Town Hall in the 1960s and 1970s include Slade, Led Zeppelin and Black Sabbath. The heavy metal band, Jameson Raid, performed in the hall in 1980 and the rock band Reverend and The Makers performed there in 2012.

In the theatre are a matched pair of pictures by Frank O. Salisbury. They were commissioned by the former local member of parliament, Joseph Leckie, "to commemorate the never to be forgotten valour of the South Staffordshire Regiments in the Great War 1914 - 1918" and completed in 1920. One shows "the First South Staffordshires attacking the Hohenzollern Redoubt", the other "the 5th South Staffords storming the St. Quentin Canal at Bellingtise Sept 29th 1918".

Also inside the building are a memorial to organist and composer Charles Swinnerton Heap, sculpted by Albert Toft, and a 2009 memorial plaque to Walsall's three recipients of the Victoria Cross, John Henry Carless, James Thompson and Charles George Bonner.

References

External links 

 Web page

Grade II listed buildings in the West Midlands (county)
Music venues in the West Midlands (county)
Government buildings completed in 1903
Buildings and structures in Walsall
Works by James Glen Sivewright Gibson
City and town halls in the West Midlands (county)